Ernesto Camillo Sivori, (June 6, 1817February 18, 1894) was an Italian virtuoso violinist and composer.

Born in Genoa, he was the only known pupil of Niccolò Paganini. He also studied with Antonio Restano (1790-1885),  (1760s or 70s-~1865?) and Agostino Dellepiane.

From 1827 Sivori began the career of a travelling virtuoso, which lasted almost without interruption until 1864. On November 18, 1846 he performed at the Howard Athenaeum in Boston, where he played Il Campanello and Carnival of Venice. He played Mendelssohn's concerto for the first time in England in 1846, and was in England again in the seasons of 1851 and 1864. In 1864, he formed a permanent trio with cellist Alfredo Piatti and pianist Charlotte Tardieu. 

Camilo Sivori also collaborated with Giuseppe Verdi. In 1893 Verdi heard Sivori performed at his private music soiree and noted Sivori's impeccable technique, agility and musicianship. Sivori's performances ideas were directly influenced by Opera characters. His violin techniques, in many instances were executed to impersonate human sounds. "Le Stregghe" is one of his best examples in which his unique ability to create such lively, almost cinematographic effects is achieved. Sivori understood that he was the only violinist alive (in the late 1800s) who could immortalize Paganini's art of violin playing and unique Operatic interpretations. The school of violin playing was rapidly changing and Paganini's art was rapidly forgotten.  He lived for many years in Paris, and died in Genoa on February 19, 1894.

He collaborated with composers of his day, including Franz Liszt. He played the first performance of Luigi Cherubini's "Requiem" in E minor.

He owned many valuable instruments, including violins by Amati, Antonio Stradivari, Carlo Bergonzi, Gaetano Chiocchi, and Jean-Baptiste Vuillaume.

Sivori's favourite violin was the Vuillaume violin, which he received as a gift from Paganini. It was an impeccably close copy of Paganini's famous Cannone Guarnerius.  This violin is owned by the Musei Di Genova and displayed in their Palazzo Tursi.

Sivori was known to adapt many peculiar pieces such that he could play them, and many of these pieces, once thought absurd, have now become quite popular. The best example of this is Giovanni Bottesini's Gran Duo Concertante, which was a double concerto originally written for two double basses, alternating the melody. Sivori changed it from two double basses to a violin and a double bass, alternating parts and sometimes playing together in the same octave.

See also 
List of violinists
Luthiers

References

External links
Anecdotal description of the relationship between Paganini and Sivori
 

Further Reading

1815 births
1894 deaths
19th-century classical composers
19th-century classical violinists
19th-century Italian male musicians
Italian Romantic composers
Italian classical composers
Italian male classical composers
Italian classical violinists
Male classical violinists
Musicians from Genoa
Niccolò Paganini